The Squier Stratocaster is an electric guitar manufactured and sold by Squier company, a marque controlled by the Fender.

While it is essentially a rebranded Fender Stratocaster, it does not qualify as a Strat copy, because the Fender Stratocasters are still considered to be of original make and Squier is owned by Fender. Manufacturers of Strat copies use the generic Strat body shape that hundreds of other manufacturers without any affiliation to the Fender company have used for fifty years. Squier Stratocasters, being inexpensive, are popular amongst beginner and novice guitarists.

One feature of this guitar is the Seymour Duncan Designed Hot Rails pickups. These are based on the Seymour design, but manufactured overseas. The original Hot Rails pickups are the hottest, highest-output passive pickups Seymour Duncan makes. Another obvious change to the guitar's overall design is the inclusion of a 22-fret neck (as opposed to the standard 21-fret neck found on most Strats and Strat-copies). These two elements are enough to distinguish the guitar from a common Squier Affinity or Standard Strat, both of which fall into the same general price range.

See also
Fender Musical Instruments Corporation
Squier
Fender Stratocaster

External links
 Official website
 Intro to Metal Guitar on London Guitar School

Electric guitars